Jennifer Guerin Zipps (née Jennifer Christine Pifer; born October 20, 1964) is an American lawyer and judge serving as a United States district judge of the United States District Court for the District of Arizona. Zipps formerly served as a United States magistrate judge of the same court.

Early life and education 

Born in Ashland, Ohio, Zipps earned a Bachelor of Arts degree in 1986 from the University of Arizona and a Juris Doctor in 1990 from Georgetown University Law Center. From 1990 until 1991, she served as a law clerk for Judge William C. Canby, Jr. of the United States Court of Appeals for the Ninth Circuit.

Professional career 

From 1991 until 1995, Zipps worked as a litigation associate for the firm Molloy, Jones & Donahue in Tucson, Arizona. From 1999 until 2005, she served as a federal prosecutor.  She was an Assistant United States Attorney, serving as chief of the Civil Division in 2002 and the Chief Assistant United States Attorney from 2002 until 2005.

Federal judicial service

United States magistrate judge service
In 2005, she became a United States magistrate judge in Arizona.

District court service
On June 23, 2011, President Barack Obama nominated Zipps to a seat on the United States District of Arizona, to replace Judge John Roll, who was killed in the 2011 Tucson shooting. On September 8, 2011, the Senate Judiciary Committee reported her nomination to the Senate floor by voice vote. The United States Senate confirmed Zipps by unanimous consent on October 3, 2011. She received her judicial commission on October 5, 2011.

References

External links

1964 births
Living people
American women lawyers
Arizona lawyers
Assistant United States Attorneys
Georgetown University Law Center alumni
Judges of the United States District Court for the District of Arizona
People from Ashland, Ohio
United States district court judges appointed by Barack Obama
United States magistrate judges
University of Arizona alumni
21st-century American judges
21st-century American women judges